Tulka is a rural locality (a village) in Dobryansky District, Perm Krai, Russia. The population was 2 as of 2010. There is 1 street.

Geography 
Tulka is located 46 km west of Dobryanka (the district's administrative centre) by road. Besmelyata is the nearest rural locality.

References 

Rural localities in Dobryansky District